The Clang of the Pick (Swedish: Hård klang) is a 1952 Swedish drama film directed by Arne Mattsson and starring Victor Sjöström, Edvin Adolphson and Margit Carlqvist. It was shot at the Kungsholmen Studios of Nordisk Tonefilm in Stockholm. The film's sets were designed by the art director Bibi Lindström.

Synopsis
The village of Brovik on the coast of Småland in southern Sweden is transformed from a small agricultural settlement into a booming port due to the development of a granite quarrying by a German industrialist Klaus Willenhart in the late nineteenth century. By the First World War his son Frans has taken over the business and identifies strongly with the local community in neutral Sweden. By contrast his father, wife Vera and brother Gert are strongly committed to the German Empire and the cause of victory. Vera leaves Frans and goes with her brother-in-law, an on officer in the Kaiser's army, to work as a nurse.

Frans bonds with Minka, the niece of a local stonemason who bitterly resents the wealthy German family, and they ultimately become lovers. When a naval mine drifts towards the village, Frans detonates it with a rifle and is fatally wounded by shrapnel.

Cast
 Victor Sjöström as 	Klaus Willenhart
 Edvin Adolphson as 	Frans Willenhart
 John Elfström as 	Olof Rydberg
 Margit Carlqvist as 	Minka
 Nils Hallberg as 	Teofil
 Rolf von Nauckhoff as 	Gert Willenhart 
 Naima Wifstrand as 	Narrator / Clothes Saleswoman
 Eva Bergh as 	Vera
 Erik Hell as 	Johan
 Magnus Kesster as 	Verk-Masse
 Dagmar Ebbesen as Hanna
 Axel Högel as 	Svenske Fredrik
 Wiktor Andersson as 	Karlsson 
 Sten Mattsson as 	Börje
 Gösta Gustafson as 	Hornvall
 Svea Holst as 	Mrs. Karlsson
 Hedvig Lindby as 	Old Villager
 John Norrman as 	Secretary
 Birger Åsander as 	Arvid
 Gunnar Öhlund as Stone Mason
 Ingemar Holde as 	Fiddle player
 Carl-Gustaf Lindstedt as	Fiddle player
 John Melin as 	Guest at the party

References

Bibliography 
 Sundholm, John. Historical Dictionary of Scandinavian Cinema. Scarecrow Press, 2012.

External links 
 

1952 films
1952 drama films
1950s Swedish-language films
Films directed by Arne Mattsson
Films based on Swedish novels
Films set in the 19th century
Films set in the 1910s
Films set in Sweden
Swedish historical drama films
1950s historical drama films
1950s Swedish films